Gabrovec pri Dramljah is a small dispersed settlement in the Municipality of Vojnik in eastern Slovenia. The area is part of the traditional region of Styria. It is now included in the Savinja Statistical Region.

Name
The name of the settlement was changed from Gabrovec to Gabrovec pri Dramljah in 1953.

References

External links
Gabrovec pri Dramljah at Geopedia

Populated places in the Municipality of Vojnik